Interior North South Highway is a federal highway in Sabah, Malaysia, connecting Ranau to Kemabung. It serves as the main highway to replace Malaysia Federal Route 500 from Kota Kinabalu to towns and villages in the Interior Division of Sabah.

List of interchanges 

Highways in Malaysia
Malaysian Federal Roads